Nightwatchman may refer to:

 Watchman (law enforcement)
 Nightwatchman (cricket), a lower-order batsman who comes in to bat higher up the order than usual near the end of the day's play
 "Nightwatchman", a song by Tom Petty and the Heartbreakers from Hard Promises
 The Nightwatchman, or Tom Morello, a musician
 Night-watchman state, a government ideal restricted to the upholding of negative rights
 a security guard who works at night
 Nightwatchman (film), a 2000 Italian film
 Street Kings or The Night Watchman, a 2008 film

See also 
 Watchman (disambiguation)
 Night Watch (disambiguation)